Ottaviano della Rovere, B. (1615–1677) was a Roman Catholic prelate who served as Bishop of Fossano (1675–1677).

Biography
Ottaviano della Rovere was born in Asti, Italy in 1615 and ordained a priest in the Clerics Regular of St. Paul.
On 17 June 1675, he was appointed during the papacy of Pope Clement X as Bishop of Fossano.
On 23 June 1675, he was consecrated bishop by Francesco Barberini, Cardinal-Bishop of Ostia e Velletri. 
He served as Bishop of Fossano until his death in October 1677.

References

External links and additional sources
 (for Chronology of Bishops) 
 (for Chronology of Bishops) 

17th-century Italian Roman Catholic bishops
Bishops appointed by Pope Clement X
People from Asti
1615 births
1677 deaths
Barnabite bishops